Wama District is a district of Nuristan Province in Afghanistan. In the 2004 Afghanistan administrative reorganization it lost territory to the newly created Nurgram and Parun districts.

Notes

External links
 Map of Settlements AIMS, August 2002

Districts of Nuristan Province